In theoretical physics, the R-symmetry is the symmetry transforming different supercharges in a theory with supersymmetry into each other. In the simplest case of the N=1 supersymmetry, such an R-symmetry is isomorphic to a global U(1) group or its discrete subgroup (for the Z2 subgroup it is called R-parity). For extended supersymmetry, the R-symmetry group becomes a global U(N) non-abelian group.

In a model that is classically invariant under both N=1 supersymmetry and conformal transformations, the closure of the superconformal algebra (at least on-shell) needs the introduction of a further bosonic generator that is associated to the R-symmetry.

References

Supersymmetry